The 2017 Mnet Asian Music Awards ceremony, organized by CJ E&M through its music channel Mnet, took place from November 25 through December 1, 2017 (dubbed as "MAMA Week") in Vietnam, Japan and Hong Kong with the theme, "Coexistence". It was the eighth consecutive Mnet Asian Music Awards to be hosted outside of South Korea, the 19th ceremony in the show's history, and the first ceremony to take place in three locations.

Nominees were announced on October 19, 2017, through the 2017 MAMA Nomination Special Live Broadcast aired on Mnet streamed nationally and globally. According to media outlets, the 2017 MAMA's had 42 million tweets, surpassing the number of the previous year.

Shows

Criteria

Winners and nominees 
Winners are listed first and highlighted in boldface. 
Following the announcement of the nominees on October 19, online voting opened on the official MAMA website and Mwave app and Qoo10 website and app on October 21. Voting ended on November 28, 2017.

Main Award

Favorite Award

Special Awards

Multiple wins
The following artist(s) received three or more wins:

Multiple nominations
All artists nominated is also present in the "daesang" categories. The following artist(s) received five or more nominations (excluding the special awards):

Performers
The following individuals and groups, listed in order of appearance, performed musical numbers.

2017 MAMA Premiere in Vietnam

2017 MAMA in Japan

2017 MAMA in Hong Kong

Presenters 

Vietnam
 Dustin Phuc Nguyen & Hari Won – red carpet hosts
 Thu Minh – main host
 Duc Bao & Ai Phuong – supporting hosts
 Le Hieu & Pham Huong – presented Best Asian Artist (Indonesia)
 Khac Hung & Angela Phuong Trinh – presented Best Asian Artist (Thailand)
 Hua Vi Van & Diem My – presented Best of Next Award
 Trinh Thang Binh & Hari Won – presented Favorite Vietnamese Artist
 Kang Tae-oh & Chi Pu – presented Best Asian Artist (Singapore)
 Quang Dung & Thanh Hang – presented Best Asian Artist (Vietnam)
 Thu Minh – presented Worldwide Favorite Artist

Japan
 Jo Se-ho, Shin A-young & Ji Sook – red carpet hosts
 Park Bo-gum – main host
 I.O.I – presented Best New Female Artist
 Chu Sung-hoon, Lee Ho-jung & Chu Sa-rang – presented Best New Male Artist & Best Asian Style in Japan
 Seo Kang-joon – presented "It's Showtime" Performance & Inspired Achievement
 Fujii Mina – presented Best Of Next Award
 Jo Se-ho & Fromis 9 – presented Best Dance Performance Group – Female
 Sung Hoon & Lee Sun-bin – presented Best Concert Performer
 Yano Shiho – presented Discovery of the Year
 Harada Ryuuji & Ishida Nicole – presented Mwave Global Fans' Choice
 Lim Ju-hwan & Kim So-hyun – presented Best Male Artist
 Satoh Takeru – presented Best Dance Performance Group – Male
 BoA – presented Song of the Year

Hong Kong
 Kim Young-chul, Shin A-young & Ji Sook – red carpet hosts
 Song Joong-ki – main host
 Kim Min-seok & Kim Sae-ron – presented Best HipHop & Urban Music & Best Band Performance
 Kim Yoo-jung – presented Best Music Video
 Ji Soo & Nam Joo-hyuk – presented Best Collaboration & Style In Music
 Kwon Yul & Kim Jae-wook – presented Best Vocal Performance Solo & Best Dance Performance Solo
 Jo Se-ho & Ahn Jae-hyun – presented Best Vocal Performance Group & New Asian Artist
 Wong Cho-lam & Jo Bo-ah (with Jeong Se-woon) – presented Best Female Group & Best Asian Style In Hong Kong
 Lee Honey – presented UNESCO & CJ Group Global Education Campaign & "Vivid Dream" performance
 Lee Beom-soo & Lee Chung-ah – presented for Best OST & World Performer
 Park Joo-mi – presented Best Asian Artist Mandarin 
 Lee Honey & Ahn Jae-hyun – presented Best Male Group
 Song Ji-hyo & Yoon Kye-sang – presented Artist of the Year
 Lee Young-ae – presented Album of the Year

Controversies

Illegal online votes 
Voting officially started on October 21, however the official website experienced issues for the following two days. On November 2, MAMA "nullified" illegal votes they detected between October 26 and November 1 and halted voting from 4:00 am to 8:00 am. In addition, they announced that they "will take stronger measures against illegal voting if it continues, including nullifying the votes confirmed to be illegitimate, blocking the relevant IP addresses, and permanently deleting the relevant accounts."

Blackpink incident 
The photo of the South Korean group Blackpink was shown blurred in red for a moment during the announcement of the category candidates.

Broadcast

References

External links 
 Mnet Asian Music Awards official website (English)

Mnet
Mnet
MAMA Awards ceremonies